Duper may refer to:

Duper Sessions, the third album by Norwegian singer/songwriter and guitarist Sondre Lerche
Mark Duper (born 1959), former American football wide receiver
Super Duper (supermarket chain), now-defunct chain of super markets once prevalent in north-eastern PA, NY, and OH
"Super Duper Love (Are You Diggin' on Me)", song by Willie "Sugar Billy" Garner, released in 1975
Super Duper Sumos, animated series with crimefighting sumo wrestlers on an adventure and fighting using their buttocks
Duper (band), Macedonian band established in 2018